Charonia variegata, the Atlantic triton or Atlantic triton's trumpet, is a species of predatory sea snail, a marine gastropod mollusk in the family Charoniidae, the triton snails, triton shells, or tritons.

Distribution
This species has a wide distribution. It has been found in European waters, the Mediterranean Sea, in the Atlantic Ocean along Macaronesia, North West Africa, and Tanzania, in the Caribbean Sea and the Gulf of Mexico, and from North Carolina to eastern Brazil.

Description
The shell size varies up to  The maximum recorded shell length is  This conical shell has an elongated and sharply pointed spire without any knobs, but somewhat squatter than the spire of the Pacific  Charonia tritonis. The lower whorls are unevenly swollen with a varix and bulge over the suture. The suture then descends in an uneven spiral. The parietal callus is lined with a narrow, dark inner lip, covered with regularly spaced, brown, rib-like plicae. The outer lip is scalloped but less projected and toothed with about 10 pairs of rib-like teeth superimposed on square, dark brown blotches. The color of the shell is mottled in shades of creamy white to yellow with brown markings. The inside of the large aperture is orange pink, and the interior is white.

The species is highly variable and does not have any known geographic subspecies.

The veliger larvae have a period of pelagic development of more than three months, drifting in the trans-Atlantic currents. These larvae are the largest known of any Ranellidae in the Atlantic; the larval shell reaches  when fully developed.

Habitat 
Minimum recorded depth is  0.3 m.

References

Further reading 
 Lamarck, J. B. de. 1816. Tableau encyclopédique et méthodique des trois règnes de la Nature. Paris, page(s): pl. 421, Liste, p. 5
 Rolán E., 2005. Malacological Fauna From The Cape Verde Archipelago. Part 1, Polyplacophora and Gastropoda
 Rosenberg, G., F. Moretzsohn, and E. F. García. 2009. Gastropoda (Mollusca) of the Gulf of Mexico, Pp. 579–699 in Felder, D.L. and D.K. Camp (eds.), Gulf of Mexico–Origins, Waters, and Biota. Biodiversity. Texas A&M Press, College Station, Texas

External links
 

Charoniidae
Molluscs of the Atlantic Ocean
Molluscs of the Indian Ocean
Molluscs of the Mediterranean Sea
Molluscs of Central America
Fauna of the Bahamas
Molluscs of Mexico
Fauna of Western Sahara
Molluscs of Brazil
Molluscs of the Canary Islands
Gastropods of Cape Verde
Invertebrates of West Africa
Invertebrates of North Africa
Invertebrates of Tanzania
Taxa named by Jean-Baptiste Lamarck
Gastropods described in 1816